Ion Santo can refer to:

 Ion Santo (fencer born 1922), a Romanian fencer who competed at the 1952 Summer Olympics
 Ion Santo (fencer born 1940), a Romanian fencer who competed at the 1960 Summer Olympics